Greenock by-election may refer to one of six by-elections for the British House of Commons constituency of Greenock, in Renfrewshire, Scotland:

Greenock by-election, 1845
1878 Greenock by-election
Greenock by-election, 1884
1936 Greenock by-election
1941 Greenock by-election
1955 Greenock by-election

See also

Greenock (UK Parliament constituency)